Quaker Hill may refer to:

Places:
Quaker Hill, California
Quaker Hill, Connecticut, a village
Quaker Hill, Hockessin, Delaware
Quaker Hill, Indiana
Quaker Hill, New York, a community
Quaker Hill (Delaware County, New York), a mountain
Quaker Hill (Oneida County, New York), an elevation
Quaker Hill Historic District (Waterford, Connecticut), listed on the NRHP in Connecticut
Quaker Hill Historic District (Wilmington, Delaware), listed on the NRHP in Delaware